Recep Niyaz (born 2 August 1995) is a Turkish professional footballer who plays as an attacking midfielder for TFF First League club Eyüpspor.

Club career
Recep Niyaz started his career at youth division of Denizlispor in 2005, where he played until 2010. Niyaz joined Fenerbahçe subsequent to scouting outputs of Rıdvan Dilmen in 2010. He signed his first professional contract with Fenerbahçe on 16 June 2010. He began playing with the Fenerbahçe A2 squad. He has scored nine goals in 14 appearances in the A2 League. Recep Niyaz earned his first senior team call-up under Aykut Kocaman and made his professional debut against Manisaspor on 16 January 2012, coming on as a substitution for Henri Bienvenu in the 79th minute. His first professional goal was against Göztepe at the 88th minute at Turkish Cup in Fifth round on 12 December 2012.

On 18 July 2018, Niyaz returned Denizlispor on a 3-year-long contract. On 21 May 2021, Niyaz terminated his contract with Denizlispor, activating the pertinent clause in return of his outstanding receivables.

International career
Niyaz played for the Turkey national under-19 football team, which won the silver medal at the 2013 Mediterranean Games in Mersin, Turkey. In same year, he represented Turkey at the 2013 UEFA European Under-19 Championship.

Honours
Fenerbahçe S.K.
Turkish Cup (2): 2011–12, 2012–13

Turkey U-19
Mediterranean Games (Runner-up) (1): 2013

Career statistics
.

1.Includes Turkish Cup.
2.Includes Turkish Super Cup.
3.Includes UEFA Champions League and UEFA Europa League.

References

External links

1995 births
Living people
Sportspeople from Denizli
Turkish footballers
Turkey youth international footballers
Süper Lig players
Fenerbahçe S.K. footballers
Denizlispor footballers
Çaykur Rizespor footballers
Bucaspor footballers
Samsunspor footballers
Gaziantep F.K. footballers
Eyüpspor footballers
Association football midfielders
TFF First League players
Mediterranean Games silver medalists for Turkey
Mediterranean Games medalists in football
Competitors at the 2013 Mediterranean Games